The South Broadway Neighborhood District is a historic residential area and historic district located near downtown Georgetown, Kentucky.  The neighborhood was added to the U.S. National Register of Historic Places in 1991.

It includes the 149 contributing buildings, 67 contributing structures, and a contributing site. It includes four separately NRHP-listed properties: Holy Trinity Episcopal Church, Branham House, Cantrill House, and Garth School.

References

National Register of Historic Places in Scott County, Kentucky
Geography of Scott County, Kentucky
Buildings and structures in Georgetown, Kentucky
Historic districts on the National Register of Historic Places in Kentucky